Michelle Meyrink (born September 1, 1962) is a Canadian teacher and former actress.

Early life
Meyrink was born on September 1, 1962 in Vancouver, British Columbia, Canada, and began acting at an early age.

Acting career
She performed roles during the 1980s in both television and in feature films, mostly playing roles as offbeat teen girls. She appeared in many comedy films, including 1983's Valley Girl as Suzi Brent and The Outsiders as Cherry Valance's best friend, Marcia. In 1984, she guest-starred on the television show Family Ties as Mallory's friend (and neighbor Skippy's latest infatuation).

She is best remembered as the female nerd Judy in the 1984 comedy Revenge of the Nerds and as the hyperactive whiz-kid Jordan Cochran in Martha Coolidge's 1985 film Real Genius. Her last Hollywood role was in the 1988 film Permanent Record.

Post-acting
Meyrink gave up acting as a career in 1989, stating she wanted more out of life than the profession was offering. During this transition period she became interested in the practice of Zen Buddhism. She moved for a time to the Dominican Republic to be near family members living there. Meyrink later returned to her hometown of Vancouver, where in 1996 she met her future husband John Dumbrille at the Zen Centre of Vancouver. Following their wedding, she and John began raising a family of three children.

Meyrink and Dumbrille currently live in Vancouver. Her family was the subject of a 2004 episode of the Canadian television series Quiet Mind which focused on their embrace and practice of Zen Buddhism.

In 2013 Meyrink started her own acting school named Actorium in Vancouver. It is modeled, in part, after the Loft Studio, which she attended with other Hollywood actors while she worked in Los Angeles.

Filmography

References

External links
 

1962 births
20th-century Canadian actresses
Living people
Canadian film actresses
Actresses from Vancouver
Canadian Zen Buddhists